Dr Vasudevan Maitreyan (born 21 November 1955) is an Indian oncologist and politician was a member of the Rajya Sabha, the upper house of the Parliament of India.

Early life and education 

Maitreyan was born to Indian independence activist K. R. Vasudevan and his wife Manga Vasudevan on 21 November 1955 in a Vadagalai Iyengar family. He had his schooling in Madras and graduated in medicine from the Government Medical College, Nagpur. On completion of his graduation, Maitreyan pursued his M. D. in Medical Oncology from the Madras Medical College and did his D. M. in Medical Oncology from the Cancer Institute, Madras University.

Medical career 

On completion of his education, Maitreyan practised as an oncologist for sometime. He has written articles in many Indian and foreign medical journals.

Political career 

Right from his early days, Maitreyan was a member of the Rashtriya Swayamsevak Sangh (RSS). In 1991, he became an executive member of the Tamil Nadu unit of the Bharatiya Janata Party (BJP). He served as General Secretary of BJP's Tamil Nadu unit from 1995 to 1997, Vice President from 1997 to 1999 and President from 1999 to 2000. In 2000, he resigned from the BJP and joined the All India Anna Dravida Munnetra Kazhagam (AIADMK). He was expelled from the primary membership of the AIADMK party in 2022.

See also
Rajya Sabha members from Tamil Nadu

Notes

References 

 

1955 births
Living people
Politicians from Chennai
All India Anna Dravida Munnetra Kazhagam politicians
Rashtriya Swayamsevak Sangh members
Bharatiya Janata Party politicians from Tamil Nadu
Rajya Sabha members from Tamil Nadu